The white-breasted parrotbill  (Psittiparus ruficeps) is a bird species often placed with the Old World babblers (family Timaliidae) or in a distinct family Paradoxornithidae, but it actually seems to belong to the Sylviidae.

It is found in Eastern Himalaya, Myanmar, Laos and Vietnam. Its natural habitats are subtropical or tropical moist lowland forests and subtropical or tropical moist montane forests.

It was formerly considered conspecific with the rufous-headed parrotbill.

References

Robson, C. (2007). Family Paradoxornithidae (Parrotbills) pp. 292 – 321   in; del Hoyo, J., Elliott, A. & Christie, D.A. eds. Handbook of the Birds of the World, Vol. 12. Picathartes to Tits and Chickadees. Lynx Edicions, Barcelona.

white-breasted parrotbill
white-breasted parrotbill
Birds of Eastern Himalaya
Birds of Laos
Birds of Myanmar
Birds of Vietnam
white-breasted parrotbill
white-breasted parrotbill